The Kanlıca Cemetery is a burial ground located on the Asian part of Istanbul, Turkey. It is administered by the Metropolitan Municipality. Many prominent figures from the world of media and music rest here.

Situated on a hillside east of Kanlıca neighborhood of Beykoz district overlooking Bosphorus, it is also known as the "Mihrimah Sultan Cemetery" after Mihrimah Sultan (1522–1578), the daughter of Ottoman sultan Suleiman the Magnificent (reigned 1520–1566).

Notable burials
Listed in alphabetical order of family names:
 Kayahan Açar (1949–2015), pop music singer-songwriter.
 Barış Manço (1943–1999), rock musician, singer, songwriter, composer, and television producer.
 Yaşar Nuri Öztürk (1945–2016), university professor of Islamic theology, Quranist Muslim, lawyer, columnist and a former member of Turkish parliament.
 Sedat Simavi (1896–1953), journalist, writer and film director.

Gallery

References

External links
 

Cemeteries in Istanbul
Beykoz
Bosphorus
Sunni cemeteries